Joanne Bunting (born 7 June 1974) is a Unionist politician from Northern Ireland representing the Democratic Unionist Party (DUP). She has been an MLA for Belfast East since the 2016 election.

Bunting was educated at Braniel Primary School and Grosvenor High School. As an elected representative, she served as a Councillor in Castlereagh for 11 years, from 2000 to 2011, and as Mayor in 2004/05.

For 18 years she worked at the Northern Ireland Assembly. In 2016 Bunting was elected on the first count to the Northern Ireland Assembly to represent the people of East Belfast.

Bunting is a member of the Northern Ireland Policing Board, and serves on the Committee on Standards and Privileges, the Assembly All Party Group on Epilepsy, and the Assembly All Party Group on Tourism.

References

1974 births
Living people
Democratic Unionist Party MLAs
Northern Ireland MLAs 2016–2017
Northern Ireland MLAs 2017–2022
Female members of the Northern Ireland Assembly
Politicians from Belfast
Northern Ireland MLAs 2022–2027